Nīcgale is a settlement in Nīcgale Parish, Augšdaugava Municipality in the Latgale region of Latvia.

See also 
Nīcgale forest

References

External links 
Satellite map at Maplandia.com
 

Towns and villages in Latvia
Augšdaugava Municipality
Latgale